Tomáš Souček (born 27 February 1995) is a Czech professional footballer who plays as a defensive midfielder for  club West Ham United and captains the Czech Republic national team.

Club career

Slavia Prague
Souček joined Slavia Prague’s youth team as a 10-year old, after joining from hometown club Slovan Havlíčkův Brod. Slovan Havlíčkův Brod subsequently netted £1.5 million following Souček's transfer to West Ham United in 2020, covering their running costs for the next ten years. He had trials with two second-tier clubs, Frýdek-Místek and Vlašim, but they did not want to sign him. Viktoria Žižkov’s manager, Jindřich Trpišovský, watched Souček play and was not convinced of his ability but was persuaded to take him on a loan costing nothing to the club.
Souček made his league debut on 8 March 2015 in Viktoria Žižkov's 1–2 Czech National Football League home loss against FC Fastav Zlín. He scored his first league goal on 16 August 2015 in Slavia Prague's 4–0 home win against FC Vysočina Jihlava.

Souček broke into the Slavia Prague first team in 2015 and played 29 out of 30 league matches in the 2015–16 Czech First League for them. However, in the 2016–17 season, his position in the first team was lost due to the arrival of Michael Ngadeu-Ngadjui and Souček played only 93 minutes in three months between September and December 2016. He went on loan to Slovan Liberec during the winter transfer window, reuniting with former manager Trpišovský, who later managed Souček at Slavia Prague, following his appointment in December 2017.

On 9 May 2018, he played as Slavia Prague won the 2017–18 Czech Cup final against Jablonec.

In the 2018–19 season, he won the domestic double with Slavia Prague and was awarded the Czech First League Player of the Year award. On 17 June 2019, Souček extended his contract with Slavia Prague until 2024.

West Ham United

On 29 January 2020, Souček joined Premier League side West Ham United on an initial loan deal until the end of the 2019–20 season, with an option to make the transfer permanent in the summer. On 1 July, he scored his first goal for West Ham in a 3–2 win against Chelsea, having had a goal disallowed earlier in the same half by VAR. In West Ham's following league match, he scored again to give his team a 2–1 lead against Newcastle United, in an eventual 2–2 away draw. West Ham announced the permanent signing of Souček on 24 July 2020 on a four-year contract, for a fee of around €21 million (£19 million). In August 2020, he was awarded the Czech Golden Ball. 

On 1 January 2021, Souček scored the first Premier League goal of 2021 as West Ham beat Everton 1–0 at Goodison Park. During added time in a game against Fulham on 6 February, Souček was controversially sent off upon review after VAR appeared to show him strike Aleksandar Mitrović in the face; referee Mike Dean's decision was criticised by many of Souček's teammates, manager David Moyes and a number of pundits who protested Souček's innocence. West Ham launched an appeal to have the decision overturned in the aftermath. On 8 February, the red card was rescinded. He finished the 2020–21 season as joint top scorer, with Michail Antonio, both having scored ten goals. Souček's exploits during the 2020–21 season won him the Hammer of the Year award.

International career
After representing the Czech Republic in several youth categories, Souček made his debut for the senior side on 15 November 2016 in a friendly match against Denmark. He made his competitive debut on 10 June 2017, in Czech Republic's 1–1 away draw against Norway in a 2018 World Cup qualifier. Souček appeared in all three matches of the Czech Republic under-21 team in the 2017 UEFA Under-21 Championship.

On 24 March 2021, Souček scored a hat-trick in a 6–2 World Cup qualifying win against Estonia.
He was a member of the Czech Republic squad for Euro 2020 which was eliminated in the quarter-finals by Denmark. Following the tournament, Souček was confirmed as the new captain of the Czech Republic, after Vladimír Darida's retirement from international football.

Style of play
Souček has built a reputation as an energetic box-to-box midfielder with both defensive and attacking qualities. He is also known for his strong physical presence thanks to his  frame. He was likened to Marouane Fellaini by José Mourinho due to his heading ability from set-pieces.

Career statistics

Club

International

Scores and results list Czech Republic's goal tally first, score column indicates score after each Souček goal.

Honours

Club
Slavia Prague
 Czech First League: 2016–17, 2018–19
 Czech Cup: 2017–18, 2018–19

International
Czech Republic
China Cup bronze: 2018

Individual
 Czech Footballer of the Year: 2019, 2020
 Golden Ball (Czech Republic): 2020, 2021
 West Ham United Player of the Year: 2020–21
 Silver Medal of Jan Masaryk: 2021

References

External links

 Tomáš Souček at West Ham United F.C. (archive)
 
 
 
 
 
 
 

1995 births
Living people
Sportspeople from Havlíčkův Brod
Czech footballers
Czech Republic youth international footballers
Czech Republic under-21 international footballers
Czech Republic international footballers
Association football midfielders
SK Slavia Prague players
FK Viktoria Žižkov players
FC Slovan Liberec players
West Ham United F.C. players
Czech First League players
Czech National Football League players
Premier League players
UEFA Euro 2020 players
Czech expatriate footballers
Expatriate footballers in England
Czech expatriate sportspeople in England